The Boy in Blue ( and also known as Emerald of Death) is a 1919 silent German drama film directed by F. W. Murnau. It was Murnau's directorial debut. The film is now considered to be a lost film, though the Deutsche Kinemathek film archive possesses 35 small fragments ranging from two to eleven frames in length.

Thomas Gainsborough's painting The Blue Boy and Oscar Wilde's novel The Picture of Dorian Gray were  inspirations for Murnau to create this film.

Plot
Thomas von Weerth (Ernst Hofmann) is a poverty-stricken aristocrat who lives in his broken-down castle with a single old servant (Karl Platen). His sole expensive remaining possession is a painting of an ancestor (similar to Thomas Gainsborough's painting The Blue Boy), which depicts the ancestor wearing a gigantic emerald. According to family myth, the emerald is cursed, and the son of the ancestor hid the emerald somewhere in the castle to stop the curse. Weerth has been searching for it for years.

One night, Weerth dreams that his ancestor steps out of the painting and shows him where the emerald is. The next morning, Weerth goes to the spot and indeed finds the emerald. The servant pleads with him to throw it away, but he refuses.

That night, a roving band of gypsies comes to the castle. They sing, dance, and put on skits for von Weerth, who falls instantly in love with a blonde gypsy girl (Blandine Ebinger). As she forces von Weerth to dance attendance on her, the rest of the gypsies steal the emerald and everything else in the castle and set fire to the building. The gypsy girl laughs as she and her comrades flee.

Von Weerth falls seriously ill. A young gypsy actress (Margit Barnay), however, fell in love with von Weerth. She now returns, nurses him back to health, and they fall in love.

Cast

See also
 List of lost films

References

External links

1919 films
1919 drama films
1919 directorial debut films
1919 lost films
Films of the Weimar Republic
German silent feature films
German black-and-white films
German drama films
Films directed by F. W. Murnau
Lost German films
Lost drama films
Silent drama films
1910s German films
1910s German-language films